Ousmane Samba (born 16 October 1988) is a football defender who currently plays for Racing Club de France Football.

MFK Zemplín Michalovce

In July 2011, he joined Slovak club Zemplín Michalovce. Ousmane made his debut for Michalovce against Dubnica on 13 August 2011.

References

External links
at mfkzemplin.sk 
Ousmane Samba at Footballdatabase
Ousmane Samba at ZeroZero

1988 births
Living people
Mauritanian footballers
Mauritania international footballers
French sportspeople of Mauritanian descent
Association football defenders
Levallois SC players
FC Les Lilas players
MFK Zemplín Michalovce players
2. Liga (Slovakia) players
FCM Aubervilliers players
JA Drancy players
Racing Club de France Football players
Slovak Super Liga players
Championnat National players
Championnat National 2 players
Championnat National 3 players
Expatriate footballers in Slovakia
Mauritanian expatriate sportspeople in Slovakia